Canso is a community in Guysborough County, on the north-eastern tip of mainland Nova Scotia, Canada, next to Chedabucto Bay. In January 2012, it ceased to be a separate town and as of July 2012 was amalgamated into the Municipality of the District of Guysborough.

The area was established in 1604, along with the original Port-Royal. The British construction of a fort in the village (1720), was instrumental in contributing to Dummer's War (1722–1725). The town is of national historic importance because it was one of only two British settlements in Nova Scotia prior to the establishment of Halifax (1749). Canso played a key role in the defeat of Fortress of Louisbourg. Today, the town attracts people internationally for the annual Stan Rogers Folk Festival.

Geography 
The community is located on the southern shore of Chedabucto Bay.

Canso is the southeastern terminus of Trunk 16, an important secondary highway in Antigonish and Guysborough counties.

As the community is situated on the end of a peninsula jutting into the Atlantic Ocean, Canso frequently experiences fog, particularly during the warmer summer months when continental air temperatures collide with cooler ocean temperatures offshore.

Canso Islands 
Canso Harbour is protected by the Canso Islands, a small archipelago lying immediately north and east of the mainland, with Durells Island (named after Philip Durell), Piscataqui Island, George Island, and Grassy Island being the largest.

The islands were designated a National Historic Site of Canada in 1925 due to their role as an important fishing base for the French in the 16th century and the British during the 18th century, and as the staging point for the 1745 expedition against Louisbourg. "Grassy Island Fort", the remains of early 18th-century British fortifications (a 1720 redoubt, 1723–24 fort, and a 1745 blockhouse) on Grassy Island, was also individually designated as a National Historic Site in 1962.

History 

Since the 16th century, Canso has been a strategically important fishery base. It is said that the harbour of Canso was frequented by European fur traders and fishermen within a dozen years of the arrival of Columbus in America, and an attempt at settlement was made here as early as 1518.

Acadian Governor Isaac de Razilly built a fortified post, Fort Ste. Marie de Grace, in 1632 at La Hève (now LaHave) with Nicholas Le Creux du Breuil as lieutenant.  Upon Razilly's death in 1635, the new Governor Charles de Menou d'Aulnay moved the Acadians from La Hève to Habitation de Port-Royal, 7 km from Port Royal, which had been given up by the Scottish also in 1632.

Raid on Canso (1718) – The Squirrel Affair 
Shortly after Cyprian Southack established himself at Shelburne, Nova Scotia (1715), the Mi'kmaq raided the station and burned it to the ground. In response, on September 17–24, 1718, Southack led a raid on Canso and Chedabucto (present-day community of Guysborough) in what became known as the Squirrel Affair. Southack laid siege for three days to Fort St. Louis at Chedabucto, which was defended primarily by Acadians. There were approximately 300 Acadians in the area.

On board , Southack killed numerous Acadians and imprisoned others. On September 18, British marines landed on Lasconde's Grave and seized the entrance to Chedabucto Harbour. The following day Squirrel landed troops at Salmon River who then proceeded to the rear of the village. Squirrel made its first attempt to enter the harbour but was beaten back by the Acadian cannon fire from the fort. Later in the day the village was captured by the land troops. On September 20 Squirrel made a second, and successful, attempt to enter the harbour. Once in the harbor, the ship fired upon the fort.

On September 23, Southack pillaged and burned the village. The pillaged goods were then loaded onto several French ships that had been captured in the harbor. The following day, September 24, Southack released the Acadian prisoners onto the Canso Islands without any provisions or clothing. Others fled to Isle Madame and Petit-de-Grat, Nova Scotia. He seized two French ships, and encouraged Governor of Nova Scotia Richard Philipps to fortify Canso.

Raid on Canso (1720) 
On August 7, 1720, 60–75 Mi'kmaq joined French fishermen from Petit de Grat, and attacked the fortification as it was being built. The Mi'kmaq killed three men, wounded four more and caused significant damage. The New Englanders took 21 prisoners which they transported to Annapolis Royal. The raid on Canso was significant because of the involvement of the Mi'kmaq and was a chief factor leading up to Father Rale's War.

In the Fall of 1720, the New Englanders finished building Fort William Augustus (also known as Fort Phillips after Richard Philipps, the then Governor of Nova Scotia). Construction of such a permanent facility was a violation of long-standing agreements between the Mi'kmaq and the fishermen, and also helped to precipitate Father Rale's War.

In 1721, the Governor of Massachusetts took a proprietary attitude toward the Canso fisheries, and sent HMS Seahorse to patrol the waters off Nova Scotia. With the arrival of British troops, the Mi'kmaq were discouraged from attacking until the following year. HMS Seahorse was replaced in 1721 by the first naval ship of Nova Scotia, William Augustus, under the command of Cyprian Southack.

Father Rale's War

Raid on Canso (1722) 
In the lead up to Father Rale's War, in July 1722, the Mi'kmaq and some Abenakis began a major offensive against New England fishermen and traders in an attempt to blockade the Nova Scotia capital of Annapolis Royal. Natives captured eighteen trading vessels in the Bay of Fundy and an additional eighteen New England fishing schooners between Cape Sable and Canso. As a result, the New England Governor declared war on the Mi'kmaq which lasted three years.

The ship William Augustus led ships from Canso to protect the fisheries, which resulted in the battle at Jeddore Harbour, Nova Scotia. Only five native bodies were recovered from the battle and the New Englanders decapitated the corpses and set the severed heads on pikes surrounding Canso's new fort.

Raid on Canso (1723) 
On July 23, 1723, the village was raided again by the Mi'kmaq and they killed three men, a woman and a child. In this same year, the New Englanders built a twelve-gun blockhouse to guard the village and fishery.

Raid on Canso (1725) 
In 1725, sixty Abenakis and Mi'kmaq launch another attack on Canso, destroying two houses and killing six people.

King George's War

Raid on Canso (1744) 

At the outbreak of King George's War, the French destroyed the flourishing fishing village during the Raid on Canso (1744).

Siege of Louisbourg 
A year later, the village Canso was used as a staging area for the 1745 Siege of Louisbourg. The British built a blockhouse, which they named Fort Prince William (Nova Scotia). General Sir William Pepperell arrived at Canso, Nova Scotia, with four thousand and seventy troops, April 4, 1745, and, in three weeks was joined by Commodore Warren, with four ships from England.

Father Le Loutre's War

Raid on Canso (1749) 
During Father Le Loutre's War, in August 1749, Lieutenant Joseph Gorham was at Canso and his party was attacked by Mi'kmaq. They seized his vessel and took twenty prisoners and carried them off to Louisbourg. Three English and seven Mi'kmaq were killed. After Governor Edward Cornwallis complained to the Governor of Ile Royale, the prisoners were released.

Raid on Canso (1752)
Another raid happened August 4, 1752.

Attack at Canso (1753) 
On February 21, 1753, 9 Mi'kmaq in canoes attacked an English vessel which had a crew of four at near-by Country Harbour, Nova Scotia. The Mi'kmaq killed two English men and took two others captive for six weeks. After seven weeks in captivity, on April 8, the two English men killed six Mi'kmaq and managed to escape. In response, on the night of April 21 the Mi'kmaq attacked another English schooner in a naval battle between Outique Island and Isle Madame in which the Mi'kmaq attacked an English schooner. There were nine English men and one Acadian who was the pilot. The Mi'kmaq killed the English and let the Acadian off at Port Toulouse, where the Mi'kmaq sank the schooner after looting it.

French and Indian War

Expulsion of the Acadians 
During the Expulsion of the Acadians the famous ship the Duke William was in port for almost a month awaiting passage to France (1758). While in port the vessel narrowly escaped a raid by Mi'kmaq.

American Revolution

Raid on Canso (1775) 
During the American Revolution, Canso was subject to numerous raids by American privateers. George Washington's Marblehead Regiment raided Charlottetown, Prince Edward Island on November 17, 1775 and three days later, they raided Canso Harbor.

Raid on Canso (1776) 

On September 22, 1776, Canso was attacked by American privateer John Paul Jones. There he recruited men to fill the vacancies created by manning his prizes, burned a British fishing schooner, sank a second, and captured a third besides a shallop which he used as a tender. Jones then pillaged the community of Petit-de-Grat and Arichat, Nova Scotia on Isle Madame, Nova Scotia and then returned to Boston.

Boats from the ship raided the community, his crews burned a transport bound for Canada with provisions and a warehouse full of whale oil, besides capturing a small schooner. Captain Jones then went on to present-day Sydney, Nova Scotia to free Americans imprisoned in the British coal mines.

Raid on Canso (1779) 

Again in 1779, American privateers destroyed the Canso fisheries, worth $50,000 a year to England.

In February 1780, the schooner Freemason struck a rock near Canso and sunk. They landed near Whitehead and 16 of the 19 perished in the woods because of the winter weather. The three survivors got to Canso on March 9, having survived by eating their fellow crew members.

Recent history 

In a plebiscite held on July 12, 2008, residents narrowly voted to amalgamate the town with the neighbouring Municipality of the District of Guysborough. The decision to amalgamate was put off, and after review was rejected again in March 2023

On January 19, 2012, the Nova Scotia Utility and Review Board granted the town's application to dissolve. On July 1, 2012, Canso became part of The Municipality of the District of Guysborough.

In early 2017, Maritime Launch Services announced it intended to lease land near Canso to build and operate Canada's only active commercial spaceport, using the Ukrainian Cyclone-4M rocket. Construction is slated to begin in late 2021 and is expected to take three or four years. The first suborbital flight from Canso will be conducted via a small-lift launch vehicle in 2023, while the Cyclone-4M is expected to make its first orbital flight from the facility in 2025.

Attractions and events 
Canso is host to the Stan Rogers Folk Festival, an annual event held around the Canada Day weekend. This event attracts over 10,000 visitors, who enjoy music from all over the world on seven different stages over the 3 days.

Each year, during the second week of August, a regatta is held within the town. This week-long event includes boat races, a mid-way, parade, seaman's memorial, hootenannies as well as various activities for the youth. The regatta draws many previous generations of the town to serve the purpose of a Come Home week. Each year, the regatta has a theme which is reflected in the parade, with 2009's being The Circus Comes to Town.

Transportation 
Nova Scotia Trunk 16, a secondary highway important to the counties of Antigonish and Guysborough, terminates in Canso, its easternmost point.

Distance chart

Notable residents 
 Joseph Goreham (1725-1790) British military officer stationed at Canso during Father Le Loutre's War
 William Clapham (1722-1763) British military officer stationed at Canso during Father Le Loutre's War
 Carlyle Smith Beals (1899–1979), astronomer.
 Hannah Norris, early feminist
 Howard Amos Rice (born 1872), one-time mayor
 Jimmy Tompkins (1870–1953), founder of the Antigonish Movement
 Richard Murphy – (1838–1916) schooner captain, born in Canso or nearby, sailed out of Gloucester, Massachusetts.
Garnet Rogers – folk singer, writer.

See also
 Consolidated PBY Catalina, an aircraft which was also named the Canso, after the town

References

Sources 
 Harriet Hart. History of Canso. Collections of the Nova Scotia Historical Society
 Judith Tulloch. "The New England Fisheries and the Trade at Canso: 1720–1744". How deep is the ocean?: historical essays on Canada's Atlantic fishery James E. Candow, Carol Corbin (eds)
 
 
John Mack Faragher, A Great and Noble Scheme: The Tragic Story of the Expulsion of the French Acadians from their American Homeland (New York: W. W. Norton & Company, 2005).
Haynes, Mark. The Forgotten Battle: A History of the Acadians of Canso/ Chedabuctou. British Columbia: Trafford. 2004
John Reid, Maurice Basque, Elizabeth Mancke, Barry Moody, Geoffrey Plank, and William Wicken. 2004. The 'Conquest' of Acadia, 1710: Imperial, Colonial, an Aboriginal Constructions. University of Toronto Press.
Robison, Mark Power. Maritime Frontiers: The Evolution of Empire in Nova Scotia, 1713–1758. Unpublished Doctorate Thesis. Department of History. University of Colorado. 2000
Geoffrey Plank, An Unsettled Conquest. University of Pennsylvania. 2001
 Whitehead. The Oldman Told Us.

External links 
`Canso – Heritage Association
 Photographs of the Canso war memorial
 Stanfest Folk Music Festival
 Stanfest Photos
 Cash-strapped Canso can’t remain a town, council decides
 History of Canso, Nova Scotia Historical Society
John Paul JonesRaids Arichat.pdf

Communities in Guysborough County, Nova Scotia
Former towns in Nova Scotia
General Service Areas in Nova Scotia
Conflicts in Nova Scotia
1604 establishments in the French colonial empire
1720 establishments in the British Empire
Populated places disestablished in 2012